The Greater Vancouver Classic was a golf tournament that was held in the Greater Vancouver area, in British Columbia, Canada. Founded as the BC TEL Pacific Open in 1994, it was a direct replacement for the cancelled British Columbia Open on the Canadian Tour. In 2000 it was re-titled as the Telus Vancouver Open.

For 2002, the tournament had agreed a new multi-year sponsorship deal with a lawn car company and was to have been titled the Perfectly Natural Classic, but they backed out resulting in a great deal of discussion over a new unsponsored name. Having considered Greater Vancouver Open and Vancouver Open, which risked confusion with the PGA Tour event, eventually it was changed to Greater Vancouver Classic, and from 2006 the Greater Vancouver Charity Classic. In 2009, the name changed again, this time to the City of Surrey Invitational; it was to be the final time the tournament was held.

Winners

References

Former PGA Tour Canada events
Golf tournaments in British Columbia
Recurring sporting events established in 1994
Recurring sporting events disestablished in 2009